Logbonou (also spelled Lougbonou) is a village in central Ivory Coast. It is in the sub-prefecture of Katiola, Katiola Department, Hambol Region, Vallée du Bandama District.

Logbonou was a commune until March 2012, when it became one of 1126 communes nationwide that were abolished.

Notes

Former communes of Ivory Coast
Populated places in Vallée du Bandama District
Populated places in Hambol